Badajahata is a village  in the Baleshwar district in Odisha in Eastern India with a population of 780. It is also known as Jahata Village. It is located about 10 km From Subarnareka River. The nearest town is Rupsa. The nearest Hospital is Rupsa Govt Hospital situated 4 km from the village.

Educational institutions 

 Jahata Primary School
 Udaya Nath Mohapatra Uchha Vidya Niketan, Barapal
 Bakharabad upme school -bakharabad
 Mohapatra High School, Rupsa, Kasipada Panchayat high school Rupsa

Festivals celebrated 

 Mahashivaratri
 Uda Festival

References 

Villages in Balasore district